Indonesia Now is a weekly programme broadcast by Metro TV, read in English language, and broadcast by all television stations around the world. Indonesia Now is the first international programme from Indonesia, first aired on 1 September 2006 to explain Indonesian news or Asian news. It has been broadcasting the programme since 11 August 2007, at 7:00 a.m. WIB (every Saturday) and 1:00 p.m. WIB (every Sunday), with its host, Kania Sutisnawinata and Dalton Tanonaka.

Segments
"IndoBiz", for marketing.
"Asia Watch", reports Asian news.
"Destination Indonesia", reviews destinations in Indonesia.
"Islam Today", reports Islamic religion in Indonesia.

Anchors
 Dalton Tanonaka, former anchor from NHK World, NBC Asia, CNN International and CNBC Asia.
 Kania Sutisnawinata, Metro TV business news anchor. He used to be SCTV's anchor.

External links
  Official website
  Metro TV presenters 

Indonesian television news shows
2006 Indonesian television series debuts
2000s Indian television series
2010s Indonesian television series
Metro TV (Indonesian TV network) original programming